Dar Al Khaleej Printing & Publishing is a publishing house based in Sharjah, United Arab Emirates. The company was established in 1970 with the launch of the daily Al Khaleej newspaper.

The company, whose name literally means Gulf House, was founded by brothers Taryam Omran Taryam (1942–2002) and Abdullah Omran Taryam (1948–2014).

Dar Al Khaleej struggled to survive in its first decade, and the newspaper was stopped from 1972 to 1980.

The purchase of new printing equipment in the 1990s enabled the company to increase the number of pages and print other publications. Al Khaleej is now one of the most popular Arabic-language newspapers in the country.

Awards
Dar Al Khaleej news website won the Acquia Engage Awards in 2021. The website is built using the Drupal CMS technology.

Publications
Al Khaleej, daily newspaper, launched in 1970.
The Gulf Today, English-language daily newspaper, launched in 1996.
Al Shuruq, weekly political magazine. Published as a monthly 1970-71 and relaunched as a weekly in 1992.
Kul Al Usrah, a magazine on the topics of family and society, launched 1993.
Al Iqtisadi, monthly business magazine, launched in 1996.
Al Azkiyaa, children's magazine, launched in 1996.

References

External links 
Official Site

1970 establishments in the Trucial States
Publishing companies established in 1970
Mass media in the United Arab Emirates
Publishing companies of the United Arab Emirates
Companies based in the Emirate of Sharjah
Mass media in Sharjah (city)